The 1999 Cincinnati Bengals season was the team's 32nd year in professional football and its 30th with the National Football League. In what would be the final season of pro football being played at Riverfront Stadium, then known as Cinergy Field, the Bengals struggled out of the gates again losing 10 of their first 11 games. After winning two straight, the Bengals faced the expansion Cleveland Browns in the final game at Riverfront Stadium. The Bengals would win the game 44–28 before losing their final two games to finish with a 4–12 record.

Offseason

NFL Draft

Personnel

Staff

Roster

Regular season

Schedule 

Note: Intra-division opponents are in bold text.

Standings

Team leaders

Passing

Rushing

Receiving

Defensive

Kicking and punting

Special teams

Awards and records

Milestones 
 Corey Dillon, 3rd 1000 yard rushing season (1,200 rushing yards) 
 Darnay Scott, 1st 1000 yard receiving season (1,022 receiving yards)

Notes

References

External links 
 
 1999 Cincinnati Bengals at Pro-Football-Reference.com

Cincinnati Bengals
Cincinnati Bengals seasons
Cincin